Pseudocolaspis tuberculicollis is a species of leaf beetle of Gabon and the Democratic Republic of the Congo. It was first described by Martin Jacoby in 1893.

References

Eumolpinae
Beetles of the Democratic Republic of the Congo
Beetles described in 1893
Taxa named by Martin Jacoby
Insects of Gabon